The annular sea bream (Diplodus annularis) is a species of seabream belonging to the family Sparidae.

Description
Body is generally grey-silver, with a dark spot on caudal peduncle.

Distribution and habitat
This species is widespread in the Mediterranean Sea, in the Black Azov Seas and in the Eastern Atlantic Ocean: Madeira, Canary Islands, also off the coast of Portugal, north to the Bay of Biscay.

It inhabits rocky, sandy bottoms and seagrass beds. On sandy bottoms, it can be often found following species that dig the sand and trying to steal their food.

Fishing
It is often caught in various nets, fish traps and light longlines. Locally, it is very important catch for artisanal fishermen and can be often found fresh in local fish markets.

In sport fishing, it is often caught from shore or from boat on rod and real or handline and in shallow waters often on rigs with floats. It is not very picky about its bait and will grab hooks baited with small chunks of fish, various worms, small prawns, mussels, various pastes, bread, cheese and similar. Sometimes it can be caught while trolling from shore on European seabass or common dentex using live prawns as bait.

Larger specimens are often caught with a speargun.

Cuisine
It is one of the best tasting fish, especially larger specimen. Barbequed with some olive oil, garlic, parsley and few drops of lemon is a delicacy. In mixed fish stew, especially when there is some fatty fish like eels, it also has great taste and aroma.

It can be used for fish soups, or even pan fried, especially smaller specimens.

References

 Annular sea bream (Diplodus annularis). Fishes of the NE Atlantic and the Mediterranean. Marine Species Identification Portal

annularis
Fish of the East Atlantic
Fish of the Black Sea
Fish of the Mediterranean Sea
Marine fauna of North Africa
Marine fauna of West Africa
Fish described in 1758
Taxa named by Carl Linnaeus